Chalciope  is a genus of moths in the family Erebidae.

Species
 Chalciope alcyona Druce, 1888
 Chalciope bisinuata Snellen, 1880
 Chalciope delta (Boisduval, 1833) (= Chalciope crestonion (Snellen, 1902))
 Chalciope emathion Snellen, 1902
 Chalciope erecta Hampson, 1902
 Chalciope imminua Snellen, 1902
 Chalciope mygdon Cramer, [1777]
 Chalciope pusilla (Holland, 1894)
 Chalciope trigonodesia Strand, 1915

References
 Chalciope at Markku Savela's Lepidoptera and Some Other Life Forms
 Natural History Museum Lepidoptera genus database

Poaphilini
Moth genera